Giovanni Enrico (born 19 June 1987) is a Chilean four-wheeler motorcycle rider who took part in the 2018 Dakar Rally, 2019 Dakar Rally, 2020 Dakar Rally, 2021 Dakar Rally.

Winner of the Stage 3 in the 2020 Dakar Rally, Winner of Stage 9 and 11, and second place overall in the 2021 Dakar Rally.

References

Sportspeople from Santiago
1987 births
Living people
Enduro riders
Chilean motorcycle racers
Dakar Rally drivers
Off-road motorcycle racers